Lysianassa (Ancient Greek: Λυσιάνασσα means 'the redeeming mistress' or 'lady deliverance') is the name of four characters in Greek mythology:

Lysianassa, the Nereid of royal delivery and one of the 50 marine-nymph daughters of the 'Old Man of the Sea' Nereus and the Oceanid Doris.
Lysianassa, an Egyptian princess as the daughter of King Epaphus probably either by Memphis or Cassiopeia. She bore Poseidon a son, Busiris, King of Egypt who was killed by Heracles. Lysianassa's possible sister, Libya also bore to Poseidon twin sons Agenor and Belus. Otherwise, Busiris's mother was called Anippe, daughter of the river-god Nilus.
Lysianassa, a Sicyonian princess as the daughter of King Polybus. She married King Talaus of Argos and bore him Adrastus and Mecisteus.
Lysianassa, a Trojan princess as the daughter of King Priam of Troy.

Notes

References 

 Apollodorus, The Library with an English Translation by Sir James George Frazer, F.B.A., F.R.S. in 2 Volumes, Cambridge, MA, Harvard University Press; London, William Heinemann Ltd. 1921. ISBN 0-674-99135-4. Online version at the Perseus Digital Library. Greek text available from the same website.
 Gaius Julius Hyginus, Fabulae from The Myths of Hyginus translated and edited by Mary Grant. University of Kansas Publications in Humanistic Studies. Online version at the Topos Text Project.
 Herodotus, The Histories with an English translation by A. D. Godley. Cambridge. Harvard University Press. 1920. . Online version at the Topos Text Project. Greek text available at Perseus Digital Library.
 Hesiod, Theogony from The Homeric Hymns and Homerica with an English Translation by Hugh G. Evelyn-White, Cambridge, MA.,Harvard University Press; London, William Heinemann Ltd. 1914. Online version at the Perseus Digital Library. Greek text available from the same website.
 Kerényi, Carl, The Gods of the Greeks, Thames and Hudson, London, 1951.
Lucius Mestrius Plutarchus, Moralia with an English Translation by Frank Cole Babbitt. Cambridge, MA. Harvard University Press. London. William Heinemann Ltd. 1936. Online version at the Perseus Digital Library. Greek text available from the same website.
Pausanias, Description of Greece with an English Translation by W.H.S. Jones, Litt.D., and H.A. Ormerod, M.A., in 4 Volumes. Cambridge, MA, Harvard University Press; London, William Heinemann Ltd. 1918. . Online version at the Perseus Digital Library
 Pausanias, Graeciae Descriptio. 3 vols. Leipzig, Teubner. 1903.  Greek text available at the Perseus Digital Library.

Nereids
Trojans
Mortal parents of demigods in classical mythology
Princesses in Greek mythology
Children of Priam